HC Ajoie is a Swiss professional ice hockey team that competes in the National League (NL), the highest league in Switzerland. The team was founded in 1973 and plays in the Raiffeisen Arena in Porrentruy, Switzerland.

HC Ajoie has won three Swiss League (SL) Championships – in 1992, 2016 and 2021.

History
On February 2, 2020, the team won the 2020 Swiss Cup, beating National League (NL) team HC Davos 7–3.

On April 28, 2021, HC Ajoie defeated EHC Kloten in game 6 of the Swiss League (SL) final and won the series 4–2 to be crowned SL champion. As a result, the team gained automatic promotion to the National League for the 2021/22 season.

On July 28, 2021, the team revealed its new logo featuring three stars to honor their three SL titles.

References

External links
HC Ajoie official website

Ice hockey teams in Switzerland
Porrentruy
Ice hockey clubs established in 1973
1973 establishments in Switzerland